Hatsu is both a Japanese surname and a unisex Japanese given name, meaning "beginning". Notable people with the name include:

, Japanese manga artist
, Japanese wrestler
, Japanese politician
, Japanese teacher, journalist and politician

Hatsune Miku (Vocaloid by Crypton Future Media)

See also
 Hatsu Marine Ltd. (U.K.), AKA Hatsu Shipping, a former subsidiary of Evergreen Marine

Japanese-language surnames
Japanese unisex given names